Carcastillo is a town and municipality located in the province and autonomous community of Navarre, in the north of Spain.  It is the site of the Cistercian monastery of Santa María de la Oliva.

References

External links
 CARCASTILLO in the Bernardo Estornés Lasa - Auñamendi Encyclopedia (Euskomedia Fundazioa) 

Municipalities in Navarre